Lee Seung-Min (이승민) is a Korean taekwondo coach and former world champion in women's taekwondo representing South Korea.

Lee won gold in the bantamweight division at the 1990 Asian Taekwondo Championships in Taipei. In October 1992, she won the bantamweight division at the World University Taekwondo Championships in Guadalajara. She won gold in the featherweight division at the World Taekwondo Championships in 1993 in New York City and 1995 in Manila. She won gold in the featherweight division at the 1996 Asian Taekwondo Championships in Melbourne.

Lee was a member of the South Korean national taekwondo team for eight years. In 2006, she taught taekwondo in Maryland.

See also
 World Taekwondo Federation

References

External links

Living people
South Korean female taekwondo practitioners
Year of birth missing (living people)
World Taekwondo Championships medalists
Asian Taekwondo Championships medalists
20th-century South Korean women